Dominique Perras is a Canadian retired professional cyclist born in Napierville, Quebec. He was part of the pro peloton from 2000 to 2008, and his major accomplishments have been stage wins on the Herald Sun Tour and the Tour of Qinghai Lake, and a victory on the Canadian Road Race Championship in 2003. In 2012, Perras is a cycling analyst on Quebec's television stations RDS and RDS2 with Louis Bertrand as commentator. Since 2014 the commentator is Sébastien Boucher.

Palmares 

1999
 Tour de Beauce
1st Stages 2 & 5
2000
 3rd Grand Prix de Lausanne
2002
 Tour de Hokkaido
1st Stages 1 & 2
 2nd Canadian Road Race Championship
 2nd Classique Montréal-Québec Louis Garneau
2003
 1st Canadian Road Race Championship
 Herald Sun Tour
1st Stages 1 & 10
 Tour of Qinghai Lake
1st Stages 3 & 6
2004
 1st Classique Louis-Garneau Montréal - Québec
 1st Stage 6 Herald Sun Tour
 1st Stage 1 Greenmountain stage race
2005
 2nd Overall Herald Sun Tour
 3rd Canadian Road Race Championship
2006
 3rd Canadian Road Race Championship
2007
 3rd Canadian Road Race Championship
2008
 2nd Classique Louis-Garneau Montréal - Québec

References

External links 
 
 
 
 Dominique Perras at Cycling Base
 
 

1974 births
Living people
Canadian male cyclists
Cyclists at the 2006 Commonwealth Games